The CONMEBOL Libertadores Futsal Femenina is a women's club futsal tournament organized by CONMEBOL for South American nations.

Results

Tournaments

2013
Held in Chile. Five teams were to participate, playing a round-robin with the top two playing the finals. Somehow, though ten teams participated and there was a semi-finals stage. The tournament was won by six time Brazilian champions and professional team Uno/Chapecó 5–1 over San Lorenzo.
 Palestino
 Santiago Morning
 Unión Temuco
 Santiago Wanderers
 Ñublense
 Boston College
 San Lorenzo de Almagro
 Bella Vista
 Uno/Chapecó
 Cuam

2015
Held in Complejo Polideportivo Ñuñoa (Estadio Nacional), Santiago, Chile between 8–12 September 2015. A total of eight teams participated. Eight teams played in two groups, the top two advanced to the semi-finals. Barateiro won the final 11–0 over Santiago Morning.

Final positions:
 Barateiro
 Santiago Morning
 San Lorenzo
 Kimberley
 Río Negro
 Sport Colonial
 Municipalidad de Borja
 Everton

2016
Held in Centro de Entrenamiento Olímpico, Ñuñoa, Chile between 22 and 29 August 2016. A total of ten teams participated. Barateiro successfully defended their title.

2017
The 2017 edition is played in Paraguay from 15 to 22 July.

References

External links
Copa Libertadores Femenina de Futsal, CONMEBOL.com

 
International club futsal competitions
CONMEBOL club competitions
Futsal competitions in South America
Women's international futsal competitions